Young England was a patriotic melodrama written by Walter Reynolds. It ran for 278 performances in the West End in 1934. The play attracted a cult following, transferring from the Victoria Palace Theatre to the Kingsway Theatre and then to Daly's Theatre.

Reynolds was 83 at the time he wrote Young England, and was the owner of several theatres. It was popular with audiences due to its unintentional humour. The show was panned by critics; TIME magazine wrote that they had described it as "the worst show that had opened in London in 20 years". The Times described the play as a "pretty melodrama" that was "betrayed by shame-faced acting" in a September 1934 review, but by March of the following year noted that the "audience are definitely over-rehearsed" speaking the performers lines in "anticipation of their cues".

The plot concerns the machinations of Major Carlingford, a 'betrayer of women, shady promoter and sanctimonious humbug' who conspires with his son to sabotage the plans of a young scoutmaster, parliamentary candidate and councillor who wants to improve the River Thames at Charing Cross. The humorous writer Stephen Pile described it as a 'serious work describing the triumph of good over evil and the Boy Scout movement'.

Stephen Pile included it as the 'Worst West End Play' in his Book of Heroic Failure.

In a December 1939 article TIME magazine wrote that "London's bright boys just had to see what the worst show in 20 years looked like. They screamed with laughter at its superpatriotic goings-on, involving gallant officers, dastardly villains, prostitutes, Boy Scouts, Girl Guides, taints of illegitimacy, stolen papers, stolen cash, the Union Jack".
Reynolds would remonstrate with misbehaving members of the audience during performances of the play.

Original cast
Disabled Soldier  – Bruce Moir
Tommy – Albert Bassett
'Enry – William Hallett
Sam – Arnold English
Ronald Spencer – Cyril Aiken
Ikey, Bailiff – E. Somerset
Izzy – Percy Cahill
Dr. Captain Frank Inglehurst V.C. – Gerald Case
Jackson – Reginald Hartley
Jabez Hawk (father) – John Oxford/Guy Middleton
Jabez Hawk (son) – Guy Middleton
Alderman Young – Sydney Compton
Councillor Wild, Superintendent of Police – Nicholas Pymm
Councillor, Scoutmaster, Hope Ravenscroft – Patrick Ludlow
Goggins – Bert Randall
Jack Norman – Reginald Andrews
Rover Scout, Lord Headingly – Barry Storri
Salvation Army Lass – Betty Dorian
Policewoman – Violet Douglas
Mrs Jones – Josie Hammersley
Mrs Maloney – Daisy Maynard
Sophie – Elsie Adams
Mrs Brown – Dorothy Garth
Mrs. Ravenscroft – Vivian O'Connor
Feeble Old Woman – Jessica Black
Louise Palmer – Barbara Savage
Margaret Thursby – Dorothy Pringle
Liza Jenkins – Mary Blackmore
Girl – Cecily Mazur
Mrs Hurst, Mrs Jackson – Irene Graham
Edith Stanley – Betty Aubery
Mrs Stanley – Zita Ponder
Miss Montgomery – Winifred Wright
Mrs Hawk – Mina Greene
Mary Ellen – Diana Moore
Lady Mary Headingly – Sylvia Allen
Duchess of Headingly – Josset Legh

References

External links
Young England – the worst play ever? at JOT101

1934 plays
British plays
Melodramas
Plays set in England
West End plays